1st Fighter Group "Kr" was a fighter group of the Polish Air Forces in France, formed on 17 May 1940, as part of Groupe de Chasse I/55. The leader of the group was major Zdzisław Krasnodębski. It stationed at the back of the front lines, based in the towns of Châteaudun, Étampes, Limoges, and Bordeaux in France. It was disestablished after the Fall of France in 1940.<ref name=one>Olgierd Cumft, Hubert Kazimierz Kujawa, Księga lotników polskich poległych, zmarłych i zaginionych 1939-1946</ref>

 History 
The group was formed on 17 May 1940, during the Battle of France. It was under the command of Polish Air Forces in France, and was a part of Groupe de Chasse I/55. The leader of the group was major Zdzisław Krasnodębski. It stationed at the back of the front lines, based in the towns of Châteaudun, Étampes, Limoges, and Bordeaux in France. On 3 June 1940, pilot Stanisław Karubin, had achieved the only air victory in group history, shooting down the Dornier Do 17 bomber plane of Nazi Germany.

On 12 June 1940, the group was joined with the group of lieutenant Franciszek Skiba. In the last days of the Battle of France, the group patrolled the area around the engine factories in Limoges, and between 16 and 17 June, they took part in the defence of Bordeaux. On 21 June, the pilots had evacuated from Bordeaux, via ship SS Kmicic, traveling to the United Kingdom. All pilots of the group were assigned to the No. 303 Squadron of the Royal Air Force.

 Members 
 major Zdzisław Krasnodębski (leader)
 second lieutenant Jan Zumbach
 corporal Marian Bełc
 corporal Stanisław Karubin
 lieutenant Franciszek Skiba (since 12 June 1940)
 lieutenant Eugeniusz Antolak (since 12 June 1940)
 platoon-leader Marcin Machowiak (since 12 June 1940)

 Citations 
 Notes 

 References 

 Bibliography 
 Olgierd Cumft, Hubert Kazimierz Kujawa, Księga lotników polskich poległych, zmarłych i zaginionych 1939-1946''. Warsaw, Wydawnictwo Ministerstwa Obrony Narodowej, 1989. ISBN 83-11-07329-5.

Fighter aircraft units and formations
Battle of France
Military units and formations established in 1940
Military units and formations disestablished in 1940
Polish Air Force in exile squadrons